José Franco Tolentino (born June 3, 1961) is a Mexican former professional first baseman who played in Major League Baseball and Nippon Professional Baseball. He was a coach for the Mexico national baseball team during the 2009 World Baseball Classic.

Playing career
Tolentino began his college baseball career at Seminole State College in Oklahoma. He helped lead Seminole to the finals of the JUCO World Series in both 1981 and 1982. He was named to the all-tournament team in 1981. Tolentino was selected by the San Francisco Giants in the 36th round of the 1981 Major League Baseball draft but did not sign.

Tolentino earned all conference honors in his only season at the University of Texas after hitting .339 and setting what were then school records with 73 RBI and 28 doubles. He Hit .458 in regional play as Texas went on to win the College World Series title in Omaha in 1983. Tolentino was a nominee for the Golden Spikes Award along with Dave Magadan. College teammates included Roger Clemens  and Calvin Schiraldi.

Before going to the big leagues in 1991, Tolentino hit in 30 consecutive games to wrap up the year. The streak was the longest in pro baseball . He hit.413 with 11 home runs during the streak (July 27 – September 1), and finished with 21 homers to lead Tucson. Tolentino drove in 56 of his 78 RBI in just two months, earning the 1990 Topps Baseball Achievement Awards for the month of August next to 3b Jeff Bagwell.

In the Minors, he played for the Tucson Toros at Hi-Corbett Field.  Tolentino Lel the Southern League in hits in 1986 with 170, was named to the Northwest League All Star team in 1983, and finished third in the league in batting; the team also included Jose Canseco, Terry Steinbach and 3b Mark McGwire.

Tolentino became the first Mexican to play in Japan. In Mexico. he led his team, Potros de Tijuana, to his first Pacific League Title in 1991, and earned MVP for the season, batting .329 with 55 rbi and 11 HR ; in 1995 and 1996 he led Monterrey to its second straight Mexican League Title hitting .342 with 104 hits, 24 doubles, 16 home runs, and 79 RBI.

Coaching career
2007- Hitting, First-base and bench Coach for Team Mexico in RIO Games 2007

2008- Managed Team Mexico to the 2008 Beijing Olympics

First-base and bench Coach for Team Mexico in the 2006 and 2009 World Baseball Classic

Broadcasting career
Broadcaster for ESPN, Anaheim Angels, FOX Sports, FOX Sports International and Direct TV.

Personal life
Tolentino currently resides in Mission Viejo, California, with his wife and 2 kids.

References

External links

1961 births
Albany-Colonie A's players
Baseball players from Mexico City
Buffalo Bisons (minor league) players
Calgary Cannons players
Columbus Astros players
Houston Astros players
Huntsville Stars players
Living people
Major League Baseball players from Mexico
Major League Baseball infielders
Mexican expatriate baseball players in Canada
Mexican expatriate baseball players in the United States
Modesto A's players
Oklahoma City 89ers players
Rochester Red Wings players
Seminole State Trojans baseball players
Tacoma Tigers players
Texas Longhorns baseball players
Tucson Toros players
Mexican expatriate baseball players in Japan
Seibu Lions players
Sultanes de Monterrey players
Mat-Su Miners players